Borrasca en las almas is a 1954 Mexican film. It stars Carlos Orellana.

Cast

María Elena Marqués		
Roberto Cañedo		
Gustavo Rojo		
Carlos Orellana		
Emma Roldán		
Salvador Quiroz		
Carlos Riquelme		
José Luis Aguirre 'Trotsky'	
Eulalio González		
Lidia Franco		
Manuel de la Vega		
Dolores Tinoco

External links
 

1954 films
1950s Spanish-language films
Mexican drama films
1954 drama films
Mexican black-and-white films
1950s Mexican films